Snipp is a village in Jörns socken, Skellefteå Municipality, Västerbotten County, Sweden. The village has repeatedly lost population and after the first decade of the 21st century, there is no longer any permanent residents there.

The village got its name in the 19th century when a geographical surveyor played with the childish rhyme Snipp, snapp, snorum, hej basalorum. Snapp, Snorum, Hej and Basalorum are four other villages in the vicinity.

Villages in Sweden
Populated places in Västerbotten County